Anastasia is a female given name of Greek origin, deriving from "Αναστασία", the Greek word for "resurrection", which can also be a surname (Anastasia (surname)).

Anastasia may also refer to:

People
 Anastacia (born 1968), American singer/songwriter
 Anastasia (surname)
 Grand Duchess Anastasia Nikolaevna of Russia

Arts

Film
 Anastasia (1956 film), an American historical drama film
 Anastasia: The Mystery of Anna (1986 film), an American television miniseries depicting events from December, 1916 to 1938
 Anastasia (1997 film), an American animated musical film, loosely based on the life of Grand Duchess Anastasia Nikolaevna of Russia
 Anastasia (1997 film), an American animated direct-to-video musical film, produced by Golden Films
 Anastasia: Once Upon a Time, a 2020 film starring Emily Carey as Grand Duchess Anastasia Nikolaevna
 Anastasia Tremaine, one of Cinderella's stepsisters in the Disney film Cinderella

Literature
 Anastasia "Ana" Steele, the female protagonist of the Fifty Shades trilogy

Music
 Anastasia (band), a Macedonian music group
 Anastasia (soundtrack), the soundtrack to the 1997 film
 "Anastasia", a song by Slash from the album Apocalyptic Love
 "Anastasia" (song), the theme song of the 1956 film Anastasia, with the most popular version having been recorded by Pat Boone, 1956

Stage
 Anastasia (ballet), a one-act ballet premiered in 1967
 Anastasia (musical), an American stage musical adapted from the 1997 animated musical film

Television
 "Anastasia" (Boardwalk Empire), an episode of the television series Boardwalk Empire
 Anastasia (TV series), a Greek television series of the 1993–94 season
 Anastasia "Jane Vaughn" Valieri, a fictional character in Degrassi: The Next Generation

Places
 Anastasia Island, an island off the northeast Atlantic coast of Florida in the US
 Anastasia, Alberta, small hamlet in Alberta, Canada
 St. Anastasia Island, a Bulgarian islet in the Black Sea
 824 Anastasia, a minor planet (asteroid) orbiting the Sun

Ships

 , a Liberian tanker in service 1947-55
 Anastasia (yacht), a super-yacht

Other
 Air Anastasia (callsign ANASTASIA); see List of airline codes (A)

See also

 Anna (disambiguation)
 Anya (disambiguation)
 Nastja (disambiguation)
 Anastase (disambiguation)
 Anastacia (disambiguation)
 Anesthesia (disambiguation)
 Anestasia Vodka
 Lady Anastasia (disambiguation)
 Princess Anastasia (disambiguation)
 Sant'Anastasia (disambiguation)
 Saint Anastasia (disambiguation)